Ratabari railway station is a small railway station in Karimganj district, Assam. Its code is RTBR. It serves Ratabari town. The station consists of a single platform.

Major trains

 Dullavcherra–Badarpur Passenger
 Dullavcherra–Silchar Fast Passenger

References

Railway stations in Karimganj district
Lumding railway division